Prof. Dr. dr. Aloei Saboe Regional General Hospital (Rumah Sakit Umum Daerah Prof. Dr. dr. Aloei Saboe, or Aloei Saboe Hospital) is the largest hospital in Gorontalo, Gorontalo, Indonesia. It is managed by the city government. In 2006, it was reported that the hospital was treating 500 diabetics in May 2006, most of them over 40 years of age, but at the time still had no doctor specializing in diabetes.

References

External links 
 

Gorontalo (city)
Buildings and structures in Gorontalo (province)
Hospitals in Indonesia